John Amagoalik  (born November 26, 1947) is an Inuit politician from Nunavik (Québec). He campaigned for Inuit rights and made a significant contribution to the founding of the Canadian territory of Nunavut. He was Chairman of the Nunavut Implementation Commission and is widely regarded as the "Father of Nunavut".

Early life and education
Amagoalik was born on November 26, 1947, near Inukjuaq in Nunavik in northern Québec. His family relocated to Resolute Bay and he was educated in residential schools in Resolute Bay, Churchill and Iqaluit. However, Amagoalik stopped his formal education after grade 9 to support his father who had fallen ill with tuberculosis. His families living conditions after their forced relocation to Resolute was poor, with no vegetation or fish. Years later, Amagoalik and other residential school survivors deemed themselves "High Arctic exiles," and petitioned for Prime Minister of Canada Stephen Harper to apologize.

Career
Amagoalik began his political career as the Baffin Regional Information Officer with the Northwest Territories territorial government from 1971 to 1974. In 1974, Amagoalik was appointed executive director of Nunavut Land Claims Project to claim Inuit land. The following year, he succeeded Tagak E.C. Curley as director of Land Claims for the Inuit Tapiriit Kanatami.

Amagoalik served two terms as President of the Inuit Tapiriit of Canada before becoming a political adviser to the Tungavik Federation of Nunavut. He was also a member of the Executive Council of the Inuit Circumpolar Conference from 1980 to 1983.

After the ratification of the Nunavut Land Claims Agreement Act and Nunavut Act in 1993, Amagoalik led the land-claims settlement process with Nunavut Tunngavik Incorporated. From 1993 to 1999, Amagoalik served as chair of the Nunavut Implementation Commission, which was a 10-member body that designed Nunavut's public government. He recommend Nunavut elect a "public government with democratically elected Legislative Assembly [which] will respect individual and collective rights as defined in the Canadian Charter of Rights and Freedoms." He was given the nickname "Father of Nunavut" for his efforts in founding the Canadian territory of Nunavut.

In 2014, Amagoalik was honoured with the Order of Nunavut. He later received the Order of Canada for his “leadership in Canada’s North, notably for his integral role in the creation of Nunavut.”

References

Living people
1947 births
Members of the Order of Nunavut
Officers of the Order of Canada
Politicians in Nunavut
Canadian people of Inuit descent
Inuit from the Northwest Territories